Emigrantes das Ilhas is an American amateur soccer team based in Brockton, Massachusetts, United States. Founded in 1987, the team plays in Region I of the United States Adult Soccer Association, a network of amateur leagues at the fifth tier of the American Soccer Pyramid.

The team plays its home games at the Parmenter Playground in Brockton, Massachusetts. The team's colors are blue and white.

History
Emigrantes das Ilhas was founded in 1987 by members of the Portuguese-speaking communities in Massachusetts originally from the Western Azores and Cape Verde. The name of the club translates as "Emigrants of the Islands". The team plays in the New England Luso American Soccer League, which is a member of the United States Adult Soccer Association Region I group of leagues. Emigrantes were the NELASA champions in 2004, and won the 2008 Massachusetts State Cup.

Emigrantes narrowly failed to qualify for the 2007 Lamar Hunt U.S. Open Cup, overcoming National Premier Soccer League side Queen City before falling to Danbury United in the final round of their regional qualification tournament.

They qualified for the final stages of the 2009 Lamar Hunt U.S. Open Cup by beating the New York Pancyprian-Freedoms and Danbury United, before losing 3-2 after extra time in the first round to USL Second Division side Western Mass Pioneers. Emigrantes's goals against Western Mass were scored by Zico Viega and Valdir Fernandes.

Players

2009 USOC roster

Year-by-year

Head coaches
  Carlos Amado 
  Bobby Monteiro

Stadia
 Parmenter Playground; Brockton, Massachusetts

References

1987 establishments in the United States
Sports in Brockton, Massachusetts
Portuguese-American culture in Massachusetts
Soccer clubs in Massachusetts